Hothouse flowers may refer to:

 Hot House Flowers (album), 1984 album by Wynton Marsalis
Hothouse Flowers, Irish rock group
Hot House Flowers, children's book by John H. Wilson

See also
Hothouse (disambiguation)
Greenhouse#Uses